is a museum of East Asian art in Setagaya, Tokyo.

History
The core collection of the museum was created by Yanosuke Iwasaki (1851–1908), the second president of Mitsubishi in its earliest form. "Seikado" was the studio-name of this corporate leader.

In the 1890s, Yanosuke began collecting artworks and manuscripts. The process of collecting was continued by his son, Koyata Iwasaki (1879–1945), Mitsubishi's fourth president.

In 1940, Koyata established The Seikado Foundation and opened the Seikado Bunko Library which was composed of books from his personal collection (80,000 Japanese volumes and 120,000 Chinese volumes.

In 1992, in commemoration of hundredth anniversary of the founding of the Seikado collection, this museum galleries were opened to the public.

Collection
The Seikadō Bunko Art Museum houses 6,500 books, artworks, and other cultural treasures.

The museum has a large permanent collection; and only part of it is exhibited at any one time.

See also
List of National Treasures of Japan (crafts: others)
List of National Treasures of Japan (crafts: swords)
List of National Treasures of Japan (writings: Japanese books)

Notes

References
 Auzias, Dominique and Jean-Paul Labourdette. (2009). Japon 2009.	Paris: Nouvelles éditions de l'Université. ; 
 Seikadō Bunko. (1991). Art Treasures of Seikadō. Tokyo:  Mitsubishi Corp.

External links

  Seikadō Bunko Library and Art Museum website;  Japanese website
 Mitsubishi Public Affairs Committee,  Seikadō Bunko Library and Art Museum
 Landscapes of the Four Seasons in the Seikado Foundation

Art museums and galleries in Tokyo
Libraries in Tokyo
Art museums established in 1992
Library buildings completed in 1992
1992 establishments in Japan
Buildings and structures in Setagaya